Frosting is a UK term for motor vehicle theft occurring in winter, which involves an opportunist thief stealing a vehicle with its engine running whilst the owner de-ices it. According to a British insurance company, the crime has contributed to the theft of 135,000 unattended cars in the past five years in the UK. This can be prevented by installing a car security system.

References

External links
The human impact of young driver crashes
Ice theft Mini used in ram raid

Motor vehicle theft